Roll with It may refer to:

 Roll with It (album), an album by Steve Winwood
 "Roll with It" (Easton Corbin song)
 "Roll with It" (Steve Winwood song)
 "Roll with It" (Oasis song)
 "Roll with It", a song by the Steve Miller Band from Children of the Future
 "Roll with It", a song by Marc Mysterio
 "Roll with It", a song by Ani Difranco
 "Roll with It", a song by Backstreet Boys from their eponymous debut album